Christmas Wish may refer to:

 Christmas Wish (EP), a 2001 EP by Stacie Orrico
 Christmas Wish (Olivia Newton-John album), 2007
 Christmas Wish (Gina Jeffreys album), 1999
 Christmas Wish, a 2013 EP by Willie Revillame
 Christmas Wish, a song by NRBQ

See also
 Christmas Wishes (disambiguation)
 The Christmas Wish, a 1998 American made-for-television film